The Venezuela women's national field hockey team represents Venezuela in women's international field hockey competitions. The team is controlled by the Venezuelan Field Hockey Federation, the governing body for field hockey in Venezuela.

Tournament record

Pan American Cup
2001 – 7th place

Central American and Caribbean Games
1998 – 6th place

South American Games
2014 – 6th place

South American Championship
2008 – 5th place
2010 – 6th place

Bolivarian Games
2013 –

See also
Venezuela men's national field hockey team

References

Americas women's national field hockey teams
Field Hockey
National team